is a former Japanese football player.

Playing career
Hiyama was born in Kyoto Prefecture on November 11, 1980. After graduating from high school, he joined the J1 League club Cerezo Osaka in 1999. On June 12, he debuted as a substitute forward against Kashiwa Reysol in the J.League Cup. However he only played in that one match and retired at the end of the 2000 season.

Club statistics

References

External links

1980 births
Living people
Association football people from Kyoto Prefecture
Japanese footballers
J1 League players
Cerezo Osaka players
Association football forwards